Nova Lux (Latin "New Light") may refer to:

 Nova Lux Ensemble of the Coral de Cámara de Pamplona
 List of Carthusian monasteries Utrecht Charterhouse (Kartuize Nieuwlicht or Nova Lux)
 Nova Lux 1648 work by Ignazio Lupi of Bergamo